The Singing Machine Company is a public company listed on Nasdaq under the ticker symbol MICS. The Singing Machine Company is primarily engaged in the karaoke business including the development, production, marketing, and distribution of consumer karaoke audio equipment, accessories, music, musical instruments, and licensed youth electronic products.

History
The Singing Machine Company (SMC) was originally incorporated in California in 1982 with a focus on professional and semi-professional karaoke equipment. In 1988 the company began marketing karaoke equipment for home use. It is believed that SMD was the first company to introduce home karaoke products to the United States. In 2001, SMC entered into a multi-year license agreement with MTV. As a part of a shift in strategy, SMC approached the mass market through large retailers. In the following year, Business Week Magazine named The Singing Machine Company #1 on their list of Hot Growth Companies.

Products

Karaoke Machines
The core of SMC's business is the distribution and sale of its karaoke machines to retailers and wholesalers such as Wal-Mart, Sam's Club, Best Buy, and Costco.

In the fall of 2015 The Singing Machine introduced its new digital line of products, no CD-G required allowing users to create playlists on the company's branded site and chose their favorite songs, download them to a USB, giving them the freedom of mixing and matching genres, singers, and enjoying the songs they want to sing.

Music
SMC has a music library thousands of recordings, which are licensed from their publishers for karaoke use. The library spans a variety of genres including: pop, rock, rap, country, Christian, Latin, motown, and oldies.

Bratz Licensed Products
In 2007 SMC signed a deal with MGA Entertainment to license the popular Bratz franchise. Such licensed products include karaoke products, digital drum sets, clock radios, TV/DVD combos, and portable DVD players.

Motown Licensed Products
Following a 2003 agreement between SMC and Universal Music Enterprises, the company released the "Motown Original Artist Karaoke" compilation series, which features karaoke tracks of Motown classic songs made from the original master recordings of the songs instead of cover versions, like most karaoke tracks. In addition, a Motown-themed karaoke machine has also been released.

Musical Instruments
SMC has a line of electronic drum sets under the brand name "SoundX".

References

Companies based in California
Karaoke
Companies established in 1982
1982 establishments in California